Turma do Chico Bento is a farming simulation social network game developed by Insolita Studios in 2012, based on Brazilian Chuck Billy 'n' Folks popular comics characters.

Based in popular farming simulation games like FarmVille, Turma do Chico Bento's first mission is to create a personalized character, who moves to the Zucchini's Village, where players can interact with characters from Chuck Billy 'n' Folks series.

References

External links
Official site 

2012 video games
Browser-based multiplayer online games
Browser games
Facebook games
Farming video games
Social casual games
Video games developed in Brazil
Monica's Gang
Level Up! Games games